"(You Gotta) Fight for Your Right (To Party!)" (shortened to "Fight for Your Right" on album releases) is a song by American hip hop group the Beastie Boys, released as the fourth single released from their debut album Licensed to Ill (1986). One of their best-known songs, it reached No. 7 on the Billboard Hot 100 in the week of March 7, 1987, and was later named one of The Rock and Roll Hall of Fame's 500 Songs that Shaped Rock and Roll. The song was also included on their compilation albums The Sounds of Science in 1999, Solid Gold Hits in 2005 and Beastie Boys Music in 2020.

History
The song, written by Adam Yauch and band friend Tom "Tommy Triphammer" Cushman (who appears in the video), was intended as an ironic parody of "party" and "attitude"-themed songs, such as "Smokin' in the Boys Room" and "I Wanna Rock". However, the irony was lost on most listeners. Mike D commented that, "The only thing that upsets me is that we might have reinforced certain values of some people in our audience when our own values were actually totally different. There were tons of guys singing along to 'Fight for Your Right' who were oblivious to the fact it was a total goof on them." Writing credits were given to Yauch, Ad-Rock and the Beastie Boys' producer, Rick Rubin.

Music video
The music video for "Fight for Your Right" begins as a mother and father tell their two sons to stay out of trouble while they are away. When they leave, the two boys decide to have a party, hoping "no bad people show up"; this prompts the arrival of Ad-Rock, Mike D, and MCA at the party. The trio start all kinds of trouble within the house, such as chasing and kissing girls, starting fires, bringing more troublesome people into the house, spiking the punch, smashing things, and starting a massive pie fight. As the pie fight reaches its peak, Ad-Rock, Mike D, and MCA run away, the party having become too out of hand even for them. As the video ends, the remaining partygoers shout along to the final chorus of "party!" before hitting the returning mother in the face with a pie.

Directed by Ric Menello and Adam Dubin, there are numerous cameos in this video, including an unknown-at-the-time Tabitha Soren, Cey Adams, Ricky Powell, members of the punk rock band Murphy's Law, as well as the Beastie Boys' producer, Rick Rubin, who was shown wearing an AC/DC and Slayer shirt, the latter of whom were also signed to Def Jam at the time.

Soren, whose hair was dyed blonde for the shoot, got her chance to be in the video because she was a friend of Rubin's and attended nearby New York University. "I worked hard at not getting any pie goo on me," she recalls, because the whipped cream used had been scoured from supermarket trash cans since there was no money in the budget for it. As a result, it was rancid and had a foul odor. "The smell in that room, when everyone was done throwing pies, was like rotten eggs. You wanted to throw up."

Fight for Your Right Revisited
In 2011, Adam Yauch directed and wrote a surreal comedic short film entitled Fight for Your Right Revisited to commemorate the 25th anniversary of the original video's release. The short film serves as a video for the single "Make Some Noise" from Hot Sauce Committee Part Two. Most of the non-sequitur dialogue between characters were a result of improvisation by the cast.

Revisited acts as a sequel to the events that took place in the original music video and features Mike D, Ad-Rock and MCA (played by Seth Rogen, Elijah Wood, and Danny McBride, respectively) as they get into more drunken antics, before being challenged to a dance battle by the future Mike D, Ad-Rock and MCA (John C. Reilly, Will Ferrell, and Jack Black, respectively), coming out of a DeLorean. Eventually, both sets of Beasties get rousted by a trio of cops (played by the actual Beastie Boys) and taken to jail.

The short features numerous cameo appearances, some appearing onscreen for only a few seconds. They include Stanley Tucci and Susan Sarandon (as the parents seen in the original video), Adam Scott, Alicia Silverstone, Amy Poehler, Chloë Sevigny, David Cross, Jason Schwartzman, Kirsten Dunst, Laura Dern, Mary Steenburgen, Martin Starr, Maya Rudolph, Orlando Bloom, Rashida Jones, Rainn Wilson, Shannyn Sossamon, Steve Buscemi, Ted Danson, and Will Arnett.

Although "Fight for Your Right" is not performed, its outro can be heard at the beginning of the short.

Accolades

(*) indicates the list is unordered.

Charts

Weekly charts

Year-end charts

Certifications

Cover versions

N.Y.C.C. version

In 1998, the song was covered by German hip hop act N.Y.C.C. as "Fight for Your Right (To Party)". It reached the top 20 in nine countries across Europe and in Australia and New Zealand. In the United Kingdom, where it peaked at number 14, it was the first song by a German hip hop group to reach the top 25.

Track listings
European CD single
"Fight for Your Right" (single version) – 3:20
"Fight for Your Right" (extended version) – 5:55
"Fight for Your Right" (Disco Selection Mix) – 5:52
"Fight for Your Right" (long instrumental version) – 4:21

UK and European 12-inch single
A1. "Fight for Your Right" (extended version)
A2. "Fight for Your Right" (long instrumental version)
B1. "Fight for Your Right" (Disco Selection Mix)
B2. "Paaarty" (Deep Star version)

Australian maxi-single
"Fight for Your Right (To Party)" (single version) – 3:20
"Fight for Your Right (To Party)" (extended version) – 5:55
"Paaarty" (Deep Star version) – 10:14

Credits and personnel
Credits are lifted from the European CD single liner notes.

Studio
Recorded and mixed at Boogie Park Studio (Hamburg, Germany)

Personnel
Rick Rubin, Beastie Boys – writing
Dee Jay Sören – production, recording, mixing
Lacarone – executive production
CASK – "N.Y.C.C." tag

Charts

Weekly charts

Year-end charts

Certifications

Other notable covers and cultural usage
Singer/songwriter Cara Quici sampled the song and added new lyrics for her 2013 song "Fight" personally approved by Rick Rubin and licensed by Sony ATV and Universal Music Group. The "Fight" video by Cara Quici features a cameo by Dennis Rodman.

On August 2, 2009, Coldplay performed an acoustic piano-based version of this song during their concert on the final night of the All Points West concert series as a tribute to the Beastie Boys, who were unable to perform on opening night following Adam Yauch's announcement that he had cancer. The band performed this version again on May 4, 2012, at their concert at the Hollywood Bowl as a tribute to Yauch, who had died earlier that day.

After winning the 2019 AFC Championship Game, Kansas City Chiefs tight end Travis Kelce chanted "You gotta fight for your right to party!" in his postgame interview. After the Chiefs' victory in Super Bowl LIV, Kelce again used the chant from the song at the victory parade in Kansas City. The song's main chorus has since become a cultural reference among Chiefs fans, and in the 2020 season became the song played at Chiefs home games to celebrate after each touchdown scored by the team. Kelce continued the tradition through his second Super Bowl win with the Chiefs, even performing the song with Jimmy Fallon and The Roots on The Tonight Show.

References

External links
Fight For Your Right Revisited at Hulu

1986 neologisms
1986 songs
1987 singles
1998 singles
American hard rock songs
Beastie Boys songs
Columbia Records singles
Def Jam Recordings singles
Kansas City Chiefs
Song recordings produced by Rick Rubin
Songs about parties
Songs written by Ad-Rock
Songs written by Adam Yauch
Songs written by Mike D
Songs written by Rick Rubin
Quotations from hip hop music
Quotations from music